Weinberg-King State Fish and Wildlife Area is an Illinois state park on  in Schuyler County, Illinois, United States.  It is located near Augusta, Illinois.

Geology and history
Weinberg-King State Fish and Wildlife Area is located on the western edge of a large plain of glacial till  left behind by the ice sheets of the Illinois Glaciation, which spanned from 300,000 to 125,000 years before the present.  Because the park is at the edge of the till plain, the park's streams, especially Williams Creek, have eroded down through the till to a bed of Pennsylvanian sandstone.

The park is based on a  parcel of open space formerly owned by the Weinberg-King family, who donated the land to the state of Illinois in 1968.

Today
The park is administered by the Illinois Department of Natural Resources.  Ponds in the park have many beautiful creatures such as  bass, bluegill, and catfish.  There are nearly 30 miles of trails maintained within the park.  The park offers resources for upland game and bird hunting, including squirrels, doves, quail, rabbits, woodcock, white-tailed deer, and wild turkey.

Illinois Route 101 passes through the park.

References

State parks of Illinois
Protected areas of Schuyler County, Illinois
Protected areas established in 1968
1968 establishments in Illinois